Mario García Romo (born 29 June 1999) is a Spanish middle-distance runner, who specializes in the 1500 metres. He competed collegiately for the University of Mississippi,  where he ran 4:07.54 to win the Mile at the 2022 NCAA Division I Indoor Track and Field Championships. After college, he joined the On Athletics Club and became a professional runner for On Running.

International competitions

NCAA
Mario García Romo is a 7-time NCAA Division I All-American and 6-time Southeastern Conference champion in Cross Country and Track.

References

1999 births
Living people
Spanish male middle-distance runners
Sportspeople from Salamanca
Ole Miss Rebels men's track and field athletes
European Athletics Championships medalists
21st-century Spanish people
University of Mississippi alumni